Bislim Kadri Bajgora (c. 1900 – 1 March 1947) was an Albanian nationalist and Axis collaborator, Adjutant for the Balli Kombetar forces of Kosovo during World War II.

Early life 
Born in Mitrovica sometime around the 1900s to an Albanian patriotic family, he grew up with guns and tales of Albanian heroism. He was from the Shala tribe of Mitrovica. When the Axis powers occupied Kosovo in the 1940s, Kosovar-Albanians saw the chance to free themselves from Yugoslav rule and collaborated with the Germans. When the Germans occupied Kosovo, the Albanians freely chose to serve in the German Army which surprised the Germans. Bislim Bajgora was offered by the DDR to join the German military police and get a plot in Hamburg, and Bislim rejected it, and said that he will not accept it and he will fight for his country.

The Germans had for a long time been very interested in working the Trepca mines and when they seized it, they started producing zinc and lead for the army. When the German forces occupied Mitrovica, they were not attacked as the Albanians saw it as liberation from the chetnik-Serbian forces. The city was handed over to influential leaders such as Bislim Bajgora, Ahmet Selaci, Ukshin Kovaqica, etc. Bislim Bajgora had a good reputation among the Shala tribe and the region had a good, strategic location enabling a good defence. When the Germans occupied the city they asked for an authoritative character and the Albanians picked Bislim Bajgora to lead the liberation forces of Mitrovica thus the Germans, in need of an ally against the Serb, gave Albanians arms and training. 
Immediately, the Shala-tribe and the Germans began cooperating and they received help from one of the most educated Albanians named Xhafer Deva who ran the German-Albanian politics in the city. Bislim Bajgora and Xhafer Deva got along well and showed mutual respect. 

On 21 April 1941, there was a gathering of the Albanian forces and the Germans at the "Jadran" hotel, where Xhafer Deva sought to station his political activities and the Germans approved of his request. Bislim Bajgora had now won full support from the Germans and was considered a good ally of Germany. He became an adjutant for Gunther Hausding, head of Gestapo, the German secret police. After the 21st of April the Germans opened up schools for Albanian language for the first time in 40 years Albanians were able to educate themselves. The tribes of Shala and Bajgora was given arms and they were enforced further by more recruits led by commander Ahmet Selaci and Pajazit Boletini (nephew of Isa Boletini).

The forces of the Balli Kombetar were mainly stationed in Mitrovica, but also among regions which were under control of Bislim Bajgora, Ukshin Kovaqica, Mehmet Gradica, Shaban Polluzha, Sylejman Viquterna, etc. The Balli Kombetar patrolled the city, keeping order but they mainly focused on guarding the borders of Greater Albania which the Germans had created for the first time since 1912.

Sources

External links
https://web.archive.org/web/20150510025652/http://www.shqiperiaetnike.de/html/body_avni_bilalli.html
http://www.ballikombit.org/index.php?option=com_content&task=view&id=161&Itemid=9
http://www.trepca.net/histori/020113-shala-bajgores-ne-veshtrimin-historik.htm 
http://www.zemrashqiptare.net/news/id_5127/Emil-Kastrati:-Epopeja-e-Bes%C3%ABlidhjes-komb%C3%ABtare-Demokratike-Shqiptare-(B-K-D-SH).html

1900s births
1947 deaths
Military personnel from Mitrovica, Kosovo
People from Kosovo vilayet
Kosovo Albanians
Albanian anti-communists
Albanian collaborators with Nazi Germany
Albanian fascists
Albanian nationalists
Albanian politicians
Balli Kombëtar
19th-century Albanian people
20th-century Albanian people
Deaths by firearm in Kosovo